Bangladesh Army International University of Science and Technology (BAIUST), a university affiliated with the Bangladesh Army, started its journey on 14 February 2015.

Location
The main campus is located in Comilla with infrastructure support from Cumilla Cantonment. Comilla is a city in eastern Bangladesh, part of the Chittagong Division. The total area of this university is 14 acres. Presently BAIUST operating their activities in two campus, Campus-1 located beside the Bir Shreshto Mostafa Kamal gate and Campus-2, which is located on the other side of the gate by the Station HQ Office. Both campuses divided by the Dhaka-Chittagong Highway and connected by the First Highway Underpass  constructed by Bangladesh Army. The permanent campus is located in Kalakachua near Dhaka-Chittagong Highway, which is under construction.

Faculties 
4 year B.Sc. Undergraduate Engineering and Hon's Courses :

 Faculty of Electrical and Computer Engineering - Bachelor of Science in Electrical & Electronics Engineering, Bachelor of Science in Computer Science & Engineering.
 Faculty of Civil Engineering - Bachelor of Science in Civil Engineering.
 School of Business – Bachelor of Business Administration.
 Faculty of Science & Humanities – Bachelor of Arts (Hon's) in English,  Bachelor of Law (LLB).

Board of Trustees
BAIUST is directly controlled by Bangladesh Army and the members of the board of trustees are directly from Bangladesh Army. The Chief of Army Staff of Bangladesh Army is the chairman of the trustee board and other government high officials, professors and Area Commander of 33 Infantry Division of Bangladesh Army placed in the board by their ranks and posts.

See also
List of Educational Institutions in Comilla

References

External links
 

Technological institutes of Bangladesh
Universities of science and technology in Bangladesh
Private universities in Bangladesh
Education in Cumilla
Educational Institutions affiliated with Bangladesh Army
2015 establishments in Bangladesh
Educational institutions established in 2015